Vishwajeet Singh (born 8 November 1991) is an Indian cricketer. He made his List A debut for Jammu & Kashmir in the 2016–17 Vijay Hazare Trophy on 4 March 2017.

References

External links
 

1991 births
Living people
Indian cricketers
Jammu and Kashmir cricketers
Place of birth missing (living people)